Arthur Reginald Baker (18 September 1899 – 1 September 1977) was an Australian rules footballer who played with Collingwood and Richmond in the Victorian Football League (VFL).

VFL career
One of three brothers to play in the VFL (along with Selwyn and Ted), Baker played his football as a rover and in the forward line. Baker was a losing grand finalist for Collingwood in both 1925 and 1926. He finished equal fifth in the 1926 Brownlow Medal. 

In 1927, Baker returned to Wonthaggi FC and was captain-coach of their Central Gippsland Football League. 

Baker returned to Collingwood in 1928 and during the 1928 VFL season, Baker crossed to Richmond, where he made 10 appearances.

Coaching
Baker coached his original club Wonthaggi for five years and steered them to three premierships in 1927, 1929 and ?   He won a further three premierships as coach of Leongatha in 1931, 1934 and 1935. Baker also spent time as coach of Wonthaggi (1941) Morwell (1947) and Yallourn (1951).

References

External links
 Reg Baker - Player Profile

1899 births
1977 deaths
Australian rules footballers from Victoria (Australia)
Collingwood Football Club players
Richmond Football Club players
Leongatha Football Club players
Morwell Football Club players